Andrew Frazer may refer to:

 Andrew Frazer, a pen name of the American author Stephen Marlowe (1928–2008)
 Andrew Frazer (British Army officer) (died 1792)

See also 
 Andrew Fraser (disambiguation)